The Libertarian Party of Ontario fielded several candidates in the 1990 Ontario provincial election, none of whom were elected.  Information about these candidates may be found here.

Julien Frost (Hamilton Centre)
No information.  Frost received 429 votes (1.7%), finishing fifth against New Democratic Party candidate David Christopherson.

Sandor L. Hegedus (Lawrence)
Hegedus was seventy years old in 1990, and was an apartment building manager.  He had previously campaigned for the Libertarian Party of Canada in the 1988 federal election.  His slogan for the 1990 provincial campaign was "less government, more freedom, more free enterprise".

Alex MacDonald (York South)
MacDonald campaigned for the Ontario legislature in 1987 and 1990.  He was a 23-year-old electronics student during his first campaign, and supported free trade and Sunday shopping while opposing "taxes, rent control and subsidized housing".  In 1990, he approved pay equity policies for government workers but rejected them in the private sector.  He also opposed rent control and no-fault auto insurance, and supported education vouchers.

Footnotes

1990